Megson may refer to:
Megson (surname)
Megson (band) an English folk duo